This is a complete list of ice hockey players who were drafted in the National Hockey League Entry Draft by the Atlanta Flames franchise. It includes every player who was drafted, from 1972 to 1979, regardless of whether they played for the team.

Key
 Played at least one game with the Flames
 Spent entire NHL career with the Flames

Draft picks

See also
List of Atlanta Flames players
1972 NHL Expansion Draft
List of Calgary Flames draft picks

References

 
 

draft picks
 
Atlanta Flames